The Affordable Insulin Now Act is a bill in the United States Congress intended to cap out-of-pocket insulin prices under private health insurance and Medicare at no more than $35 per month.

https://www.cbsnews.com/news/insulin-price-cap-senate-republicans-block-inflation-reduction-act/

The bill was first introduced on February 25, 2022, by Representative Angie Craig (D-MN). On March 31, 2022, the bill passed the House of Representatives, 232–193.

The bill was blocked by Senate Republicans on August 8 2022

References 

United States federal health legislation
United States proposed federal health legislation
Proposed legislation of the 117th United States Congress